The Konjsko Tunnel is located between Vučevica and Dugopolje interchanges of the A1 motorway, in the central Dalmatia region of Croatia.

The tunnel tubes were completed simultaneously. Its construction has been completed in 2004. The northern portal of the tunnel is at elevation of 343.7 m.a.s.l., while the southern one is found at 338.7 m.a.s.l. The maximum permitted driving speed in the tunnel is 100 km/h.

The tunnel is operated and maintained by Hrvatske autoceste.

Traffic volume 

Traffic is regularly counted and reported by Hrvatske autoceste, operator of the motorway, and published by Hrvatske ceste. Substantial variations between annual (AADT) and summer (ASDT) traffic volumes are attributed to the fact that the motorway carries substantial tourist traffic to the Dalmatian Adriatic resorts. The traffic count is performed using analysis of toll ticket sales.

See also 
 A1 motorway
 Sveti Rok Tunnel
 Mala Kapela Tunnel

References 

Road tunnels in Croatia
Buildings and structures in Split-Dalmatia County
Tunnels completed in 2004
Transport in Split-Dalmatia County